The Left Coalition (Leva koalicija) was a coalition of left-wing nationalist political parties in Serbia for the 1996 Yugoslavian parliamentary election and then for the 1997 Serbian general election.

History
The coalition was made up of the Socialist Party of Serbia (SPS), Yugoslav Left (JUL) and New Democracy (ND). It was led by Slobodan Milošević the leader of SPS, but also main actors were Mirjana Marković the leader of Yugoslav Left and Dušan Mihajlović the leader of New Democracy. Following the 1997 election, it formed a coalition government with the Serbian Radical Party (SRS). In 1998 ND left the coalition and after the defeat in the 2000 Yugoslavian general election the Left Coalition was disbanded.

Members

References

Defunct political party alliances in Serbia
Socialist parties in Serbia
Serbian nationalism
1997 establishments in Serbia
Socialist Party of Serbia